Christina Hurihia Wirihana (b 1949) is a New Zealand weaver from Te Arawa, Ngāti Maniapoto, Ngāti Pikiao, Ngāti Rangiunora, Ngāti Raukawa, Tainui iwi.

Biography 
Wirihana was born in Rotorua in 1949. Her mother is the renowned weaver Matekino Lawless. Wirihana attributes Dame Rangimarie Hetet, Diggeress Te Kanawa and Emily Schuster as major influences but states her mother as being her most significant teacher.

Wirihana was commissioned to weave an installation of harakeke panels that was part of a touring exhibition called Anō te Ātaahua - Honouring the Gifts of our Elders (2000-2002) that was presented in Auckland, Waikato, Rotorua and Whangārei.

Wirihana is currently a senior lecturer at Toihoukura, a Māori visual arts school within the Eastern Institute of Technology, and has previously been fibre tutor at the Waiariki Polytechnic in Rotorua. The significant international touring exhibition Toi Māori: The Eternal Thread was co-curated by Wirihana.

Her weaving is often an exploration of natural materials and processes. "In my weaving I am continually inspired by the surrounds of my maunga (mountain) Matawhaura, moana tapu Rotoiti (Lake Rotoiti), my marae Taurua and especially my whanau (family)."

Recognition
Wirihana is the Chairperson of Te Roopu Raranga Whatu o Aotearoa (National Collective of Māori Weavers in New Zealand). In 2014 this collective of weavers exhibited 49 tukutuku panels in Kāhui Raranga: The Art of Tukutuku at Museum of New Zealand Te Papa Tongarewa. These panels are to be installed early 2015 at the Headquarters of the United Nations in New York.

Wirihana has received numerous funding from Creative New Zealand to develop new work and travel overseas for residencies, the most recent being a 2014 artist residency in Hawaii. In 2003 Wirihana received Te Tohu Toi Kē from Te Waka Toi Creative New Zealand for making a positive development within Māori arts. Wirihana is a lifelong member of the Māori Women’s Welfare League.

Notable works
The British Museum holds five kete whakairo made by Wirihana in 1993. One is described as plaited from undyed kiekie leaf strips in an all-over twilled pattern of horizontal bands of diamonds. There is a band of check plaiting at the rim and handles made of braided muka. A second is also decorated with a diamond pattern, the third with decorative plaiting bands alternating with bands of twill, with a check weave at base and rim; the fourth has a vertical zigzag pattern known as koeaea, which is a type of whitebait); the fifth has horizontal bands of pattern with openwork.

Exhibitions
Wirihana has exhibited, attended symposia and residencies both nationally and internationally including:
2014 Māori Art Market Wellington 
2009 Plastic Māori The Dowse Art Museum 
2006 Artist Residency Evergreen State College in Olympia, Washington 
1998 Kanak Cultural Centre, Jean-Marie Tjibaou Cultural Centre Nouméa 
1992 Seven Māori Weavers Christchurch
1991 Ngā Kaupapa Here Aho Te Taumata, Auckland
1991 Te Moemoea nō Iotefa Sarjent Gallery, Whanagnui
1990 Ngā wahine Toa Rotoruatamati
1990 Kohia Ko Taikaka Anake National Art Gallery Wellington

References

External links
 An interview of Wirihana showing her weaving

1949 births
Living people
New Zealand artists
New Zealand Māori weavers
New Zealand Māori artists
Te Arawa people
Ngāti Maniapoto people
Women textile artists